The 2013–14 Nicholls State Colonels men's basketball team represented Nicholls State University during the 2013–14 NCAA Division I men's basketball season. The Colonels, led by tenth year head coach J. P. Piper, played their home games at Stopher Gym and were members of the Southland Conference. They finished the season 14–15, 10–8 in Southland play to finish in a tie for sixth place. They advanced to the quarterfinals of the Southland Conference tournament where they lost to Northwestern State.

Roster

Schedule

|-
!colspan=9 style="background:#FF0000; color:#808080;"|  Exhibition

|-
!colspan=9 style="background:#FF0000; color:#808080;"|  Regular season

|-
!colspan=9 style="background:#FF0000; color:#808080;"| Southland tournament

Source

References

Nicholls Colonels men's basketball seasons
Nicholls State
2013 in sports in Louisiana
2014 in sports in Louisiana